Serqueux is a commune in the Seine-Maritime department in the Normandy region in northern France.

Geography
The Serqueux station is an important interchange station for TER regional trains, with connections to Rouen, Amiens, Lille and Gisors. Serqueux has an important plant producing most of the gum arabic in the world. The commune has also an important commercial zone which is by far the biggest in the canton.

History
First mentioned as "Sarkeus" in the twelfth century, the name derives from the Greek , owing to the large Merovingian necropolis in the commune.

Much of the village including the church, was destroyed by Allied bombing during World War II. Nevertheless, the railway station, which was the goal of the bombings, remained untouched.

In 1945, the commune was awarded the Croix de Guerre.

Population

Places of interest
 The modern church, replacing the sixteenth-century one, destroyed during World War II.
 Traces of a feudal castle.
 Ruins of the old church.

See also
Communes of the Seine-Maritime department

References

External links

Serqueux on the Quid website 

Communes of Seine-Maritime